The California spiny lobster (Panulirus interruptus) is a species of spiny lobster found in the eastern Pacific Ocean from Monterey Bay, California, to the Gulf of Tehuantepec, Mexico. The interrupted grooves across the tail are characteristic for the species.

Females can carry up to 680,000 eggs, which hatch after 10 weeks into flat phyllosoma larvae. These feed on plankton before the metamorphosis into the juvenile state. The spiny lobster is eaten by various fish, octopuses and sea otters, but can defend itself with a loud noise produced by its antennae. The California spiny lobster is the subject of both commercial and recreational fishery in both Mexico and the United States, with sport fishermen using hoop nets and commercial fishermen using lobster traps.

Description
In common with all spiny lobsters, the California spiny lobster has two large, spiny antennae, but no large claws on its legs. The upper side of the animal is brownish red, without the paler bands or spots seen in some other spiny lobsters. The legs are a similar color, but with one or more lighter streaks running along their length.

Males and females of all ages can be distinguished by the position of the two round genital openings or gonopores. In females, they are at the bases of the third pair of pereiopods, while in males they are at the base of the fifth (last) pereiopods, furthest from the head and the closest to the abdomen. Mature females have a small claw on the fifth pereiopod, and enlarged pleopods.

Distribution
The California spiny lobster is found in parts of the Gulf of California, and along the Pacific coast of the length of the Baja California peninsula, extending as far north as San Luis Obispo Bay, California. There are occasional records from Monterey Bay, but the water there is too cold for the California spiny lobster to breed, and it is thought that any adult found in Central California arrived as a larva during El Niño years.

Although adults can be found in shallow water, including tide pools, they are more frequent in deeper waters.

Ecology and behavior

California spiny lobsters are nocturnal, hiding in crevices during the day, with only the tips of their long antennae showing, as a means of avoiding predators. Towards dawn, the spiny lobsters form aggregations, which they maintain until dusk. At night, they emerge and feed on sea urchins, clams, mussels and worms. This activity is important in limiting sea urchin populations, and so maintaining healthy seabed communities.

Natural predators of the California spiny lobster include bony fish such as the California sheephead, giant sea bass and cabezone, sharks including the horn shark and leopard shark, octopuses and sea otters. In response to an approaching predator, spiny lobsters including the California spiny lobster can produce a loud noise using the stick-slip phenomenon, akin to a bowed instrument. The bases of the antennae act as a plectrum, which is rubbed over a file on the edge of the antennular plate. If a predator is very close, spiny lobsters will flex their muscular tail in order to escape the predator, backwards.

Life cycle

Because all the hard parts are lost at each molt, the life span of mature spiny lobsters is uncertain; they are thought to live for 50 years or more.

Spiny lobsters do not have the gonopods (first pleopods modified for reproduction) that occur in clawed lobsters and crabs, and females do not have a deep pocket on the sternum in which to store sperm. Instead, a spermatophore is transferred directly from one of the male's gonopores to the sternum of the female. The male gonopore is, however, adorned with a "penile process", which is straight and serrated, with a small "hairbrush". The sternum of mature females has three "windows" on the last three segments, which uniquely among Panulirus species, span both halves of the sternum. These windows are softer than the rest of the exoskeleton, and are thought to help the male locate the correct location to place the tar-like spermatophore.

After mating, the fertilized eggs are carried on the female's pleopods until they hatch, with between 120,000 and 680,000 carried by a single female. The eggs begin coral red, but darken as they develop to a deep maroon. When she is carrying the eggs, the female is said to be "berried". The eggs are ready to hatch after 10 weeks, and spawning takes place from May to August, The larvae that hatch (called phyllosoma larvae) do not resemble the adults. The full series of larval molts takes around 7 months, and when the last stage molts, it metamorphoses into the puerulus state, the final larval stage, still transparent. The puerulus larvae settle to the sea floor when the water is near its maximum temperature, which in Baja California is in the fall.

The diet of the juveniles is varied, but comprises mostly amphipods and isopods, together with coralline algae and the plant Phyllospadix. When available, the juveniles prefer to eat crabs.

Fishery
In his original description, John Witt Randall noted that the California spiny lobster is "used as food by the natives" of Upper California. The California spiny lobster is now the most economically important lobster on the American West Coast. Sport fishing may account for up to half the entire catch, while most of the commercial catch comes from lobster traps, with smaller amounts coming from the use of trammel nets or by trawling. The major fishing area is west of Baja California, and imports from Mexico to the United States are twice the amount produced in California.

Sport fishing in California

Recreational fishermen are allowed to catch lobsters with hoop nets or by SCUBA diving or free-diving; almost all come from California, with only small numbers from other U.S. states.

The California Department of Fish and Game sets and enforces a number of regulations pertaining to recreational fishing of spiny lobsters:
 Open season for California spiny lobster runs from the Saturday before the first Wednesday in October until the first Wednesday after March 15.
 No implements other than hoop nets may be used; no one person may have more than 5 nets and no vessel may use more than 10 hoop nets. When fishing from land, each fisherman is limited to two hoop nets.
 Lobster fishers may not land more than seven California spiny lobsters on any given day, and may not have more than seven in their possession at any time.
 Fishers must carry a lobster gauge, and any lobster smaller than the minimum landing size must be returned to the sea immediately.
 To fish for spiny lobster south of Point Arguello, a sport fishing license with ocean enhancement stamp must be displayed or kept nearby.
 A report card for the season must be bought, filled in and returned before April 30 after the season ends.
 Commercial and recreational traps must not be interfered with.

Commercial fishing in California
The open season for commercial fishing begins on the first Wednesday in October and runs until the first Wednesday after the 15th of March. Commercial fishermen may use individually buoyed traps, but may not dive for lobsters.

For those using lobster traps, the fishing effort is greatest at the beginning of the permitted season in California, and peters out towards the end of the season, 24 weeks later. Although the fishing effort becomes better concentrated on areas with more spiny lobsters during the season, the fishing efficiency (catch per unit effort) nonetheless decreases throughout the season.

Fishing in Mexico
In Mexico, spiny lobsters are an important commercial resource, representing the fifth most valuable fishery, worth US$18 million. Three species are exploited along the Pacific coast of the Baja California peninsula, but the catch of 744 t of the California spiny lobster makes up 95%–97% of the total, with only small quantities of Panulirus inflatus and Panulirus gracilis. The fishing rights are held by 26 local co-operatives.

The Mexican fishery for the California spiny lobster was the first Latin American fishery to be awarded the Marine Stewardship Council's sustainable fishery ecolabel, and the species is classed as Least Concern on the IUCN Red List.

Names

The preferred common name of the United States Fish and Wildlife Service is simply spiny lobster.

John Witt Randall described the species in the Journal of the Academy of Natural Sciences of Philadelphia in 1840, based on material given to him by Thomas Nuttall. The exact locality is not known, being given only as "Upper California", but the most likely sources are the places where Nuttall was most active, namely Santa Barbara and San Diego. The specific epithet interruptus refers to the grooves on the abdominal tergites, which are interrupted in this species. Although originally placed in the genus Palinurus, the California spiny lobster was later transferred to Adam White's new genus Panulirus, together with other spiny lobsters that have long flagella on their first antennae.

Related species
The closest relatives are not the other species that occur in the East Pacific, but rather Panulirus argus from the Caribbean Sea and West Pacific species such as Panulirus japonicus, Panulirus marginatus, Panulirus pascuensis, Panulirus cygnus and Panulirus longipes; this relationship has been recovered from comparative studies of adult and larval morphology, as well as from molecular phylogenetics, using the sequences from cytochrome c oxidase and 16S ribosomal RNA genes.

The California spiny lobster can be differentiated from the other species in the genus by the interrupted grooves across the abdomen; other species either lack grooves, or have grooves which span the entire body segment.

References

External links

 

Achelata
Crustaceans of the eastern Pacific Ocean
Commercial crustaceans
Edible crustaceans
Crustaceans described in 1840
Fauna of California
Seafood in Native American cuisine
Least concern biota of North America